Shake Hands with the Devil is the title of:
 Shake Hands with the Devil (1959 film), directed by Michael Anderson
 Shake Hands with the Devil (2007 film), a Canadian feature film adapted from Dallaire's book
 Shake Hands with the Devil (album), a 1979 Kris Kristofferson album
 Shake Hands with the Devil (book), by Lieutenant-General Roméo Dallaire covering the Rwandan genocide
 Shake Hands With the Devil: The Journey of Roméo Dallaire, a 2004 Canadian documentary film inspired by Dallaire's book